Joely is a given name. It is a variation of either the name Joelle or Joel. Notable people with this name include:

Feminine name
Joely Andrews (born 2002), Northern Irish footballer
Joely Collins (born 1972), British-Canadian actress and producer, daughter of musician Phil Collins
Joely Fisher (born 1967), American actress and singer, daughter of singer Eddie Fisher and actress Connie Stevens
Joely Richardson (born 1965), English actress, daughter of Vanessa Redgrave and Tony Richardson

Masculine name
Joely Rodríguez (born 1991), Dominican MLB baseball player